Grevillea 'Robyn Gordon' is a grevillea cultivar which has been planted widely in Australia and other countries.

Description
It is a shrub that grows to two metres high and three metres wide, with divided leaves. The deep red inflorescences are about 15 cm long by 9 cm wide and attract honeyeaters.

Origins
The cultivar, was a chance cross between a red-flowered form of Grevillea banksii and G. bipinnatifida, selected by the late plant collector David Gordon in Queensland  for its prolific and sustained flowering. Trials, which began in 1963, demonstrated stability in its characteristics and it was released to the nursery trade in 1968.  It was registered in 1973 under the name 'Robyn Gordon' in memory of his daughter who died in 1969, aged 16.

Allergies
Along with a number of other grevilleas in the Robyn Gordon group of cultivars, it may cause allergic contact dermatitis for certain sensitive individuals who come into contact with it.

See also
 List of Grevillea cultivars

References

Robyn Gordon
Cultivars of Australian plants
Garden plants of Australia
Proteales of Australia